Susan Helen Brown (born 1 April 1958) is a New Zealand former cricketer who played as a right-arm medium bowler. She appeared in 6 Test matches and 18 One Day Internationals for New Zealand between 1979 and 1986. She played domestic cricket for Canterbury.

References

External links

1958 births
Living people
Cricketers from Christchurch
New Zealand women cricketers
New Zealand women Test cricketers
New Zealand women One Day International cricketers
Canterbury Magicians cricketers